The 1923–24 Scottish Division Two was won by St Johnstone who, along with second placed Cowdenbeath, were promoted to Division One. Vale of Leve and Lochgelly United finished 19th and 20th respectively and were relegated to Division Three.

Table

References 

 Scottish Football Archive

Scottish Division Two seasons
2
Scot